Title 47 CFR Part 68 is a section of the Code of Federal Regulations of the United States that regulate the direct electrical connection of telecommunications equipment and customer premises wiring with the public switched telephone network, certain private line services, and connection of private branch exchange (PBX) equipment to certain telecommunication interfaces.

Scope
The direct connection of telecommunications equipment and customer premises wiring with the public switched telephone network and certain private line services, such as
foreign exchange lines at the customer premises end
the station end of off-premises stations associated with PBX and Centrex services
trunk-to-station tie lines at the trunk end only
switched service network station lines, i.e., common control switching arrangements
The direct connection of
all PBX and similar systems to private line services for tie trunk type interfaces,
off-premises station lines, and (3) automatic identified outward dialing (AIOD) and message registration. 

Part 68 rules provide the technical and procedural standards under which direct electrical connection of customer-provided telephone equipment, systems, and protective apparatus may be made to the nationwide network without causing harm and without a requirement for protective circuit arrangements in the service-provider networks.

The equivalent European regulation is called TBR21.

References

 FCC 47 CFR Part 68 section 68.502 superseded by T1.TR5-1999

External links
ACTA documents
T1.TR5-1999

Local loop
United States communications regulation
Code of Federal Regulations